Murder Was the Case is the fifth studio album by American rapper Gucci Mane. It was released on May 5, 2009, through Big Cat Records with distribution via Tommy Boy Entertainment. Production was handled by DJ Speedy, Zaytoven, Melvin "Mel Man" Breeden and Marlon "Big Cat" Rowe, the latter two also served as executive producers.

The album debuted at number 23 on the Billboard 200, making it Gucci Mane's third highest charting album at the time. Two singles were released off the album, the first being "Stoopid", which was released on January 13, 2009. The second single was "Runnin' Back", which was released on April 22, 2009. Both singles had the following versions of the songs: main, clean, instrumental, dirty and clean a cappellas. The single versions of both songs are longer than on the album ("Runnin' Back" is 4:15 on the single and only 3:52 on the album).

Controversy 
The album was the subject of controversy between Gucci Mane and Big Cat Records CEO Melvin Rowe, who released the album unofficially. However, in November 2010, the two squashed their beef and announced that they would be working together again.

Track listing

Charts

Weekly charts

Year-end charts

References

External links

2009 albums
Gucci Mane albums
Albums produced by Zaytoven